The 1913 International cricket season was from April 1913 to August 1913.

Season overview

June

Australia in North America

July

Ireland in Scotland

References

1913 in cricket